"Kiss the Bride" is a song by English musician Elton John, from his 17th studio album, Too Low for Zero released as the third single of the album. Written by John and Bernie Taupin, the up-beat song was a top 40 hit in many countries.

In 2021, it was included on a mashup song called "Cold Heart (Pnau remix)" that became an instant hit worldwide for Dua Lipa and Elton John, and created a revival in interest in John's music. The mashup song was made by the Australian dance trio Pnau using lyrics from four different Elton John songs including "Kiss the Bride", "Rocket Man", "Sacrifice" and "Where's the Shoorah?".

John played this song on setlists from 1983 until the 1989 leg of his Sleeping with the Past Tour. The music video of the song was directed by the rock duo Godley & Creme, formerly of the art rock group 10cc.

Song meaning
The song depicts a man being in love with a woman who is now about to marry someone else. They had a relationship before and they have parted, leaving on good enough terms for the narrator to attend her wedding to her new sweetheart.

He is still in love with her (the bride) and wishes he could be getting back with her but he accepts that she doesn't love him anymore as a romantic partner, but loved as a friend and she is happy with her husband-to-be. On the one hand, he is happy to see her happy, but secretly longs for her. He really wants to stop the ceremony but he doesn't know if it will work to make her love him again for the second time.

Chart performance
The song reached No. 20 on the UK Singles Chart, No. 25 on the Billboard Hot 100 chart, No. 25 in Australia, No. 37 in Canada, No. 17 in Ireland, No. 32 in New Zealand, and No. 58 in Germany.

Charts

Personnel
 Elton John – vocals, piano, synthesizers
 Davey Johnstone – electric guitar, backing vocals
 Dee Murray – bass guitar, backing vocals
 Nigel Olsson – drums, backing vocals

References

1983 songs
1983 singles
Elton John songs
Geffen Records singles
The Rocket Record Company singles
Songs with music by Elton John
Songs with lyrics by Bernie Taupin
Song recordings produced by Chris Thomas (record producer)